José Luis Vellon (born 4 July 1954) is a Puerto Rican boxer. He competed in the men's featherweight event at the 1972 Summer Olympics.

References

1954 births
Living people
Puerto Rican male boxers
Olympic boxers of Puerto Rico
Boxers at the 1972 Summer Olympics
Place of birth missing (living people)
AIBA World Boxing Championships medalists
Featherweight boxers